Qadbak Investments Ltd is a British Virgin Islands registered company which has served as the vehicle for the purchase of English football club Notts County for £1, and for the failed attempt to purchase Formula One team BMW Sauber.

The company first came to public prominence in July 2009 upon their purchase of Notts County via its subsidiary Munto Finance. In September 2009, it was announced that they had signed an agreement to purchase the BMW Sauber Formula One team, hastening its return to the F1 fold.

Qadbak Investments was purported by numerous sources, including official statements from both Notts County and BMW, to represent the collective interests of "certain Middle Eastern and European-based families". In November 2009, it was discovered that behind Qadbak Investments there are no such investors.

Ownership structure
Details concerning the source of the company's finances have been kept confidential, with both initial and later reports and official press releases stating that it is "Swiss-based". Later reports have stated that the company, as well as its subsidiary Munto Finance, are registered within the British Virgin Islands, what has been confirmed by British Virgin Islands Financial Services Commission on 24 September 2009 after a request made by Swiss newspaper SonntagsZeitung.

History 

The company had been represented during the BMW Sauber takeover by Lionel Fischer, a Swiss national, and two of its representative directors on the Notts County board, Peter and Nathan Willett, who appointed Sven-Goran Eriksson as director of football. On 27 November 2009 The Guardian revealed that Sven-Goran Eriksson had demanded immediate payment of the multimillion-pound sum under the terms of his recruitment by Notts County.

German automotive conglomerate BMW were advised during the planning phases of Qadbak's takeover by leading British investment bank Rothschild, whose managing director Meyrick Cox had stated that Qadbak was "a wholly reputable organisation". In November 2009 however Rothschild denied being involved in any financial transaction between Qadbak and BMW; they merely acted as BMW's adviser.

Contrary to reports by the British media, the source of Qadbak's finances were indeed known to the Notts County Supporters' Trust, who were bound to a confidentiality agreement due to the takeover. On 27 September 2009, Notts County released a statement in which it revealed two families who were purportedly involved in the trust which owns the club, the Shafi and Hyat families, both "noted business families" with "numerous investments" in the Middle East, Japan, Kazakhstan, Europe and North America, with the club having "respected the families' privacy" beforehand. In a response to the press release, Anwar Shafi, a member of the Shafi family, denied that he had a connection with the club or an investment in Qadbak. The club subsequently released a further statement, purporting to be from the Hyat/Shafi Family Trust and its head, Sardar Hyat, confirming its involvement with Qadbak and Notts County.

On 20 October 2009, the Football League announced that Notts County's owners had met its "fit and proper persons" regulations, and that while their structure was "complicated" and featured "both offshore entities and discretionary trusts", it had provided "extensive disclosure" to the League on their ownership structure. The League also stated that public disclosure of their ownership structure was a "matter for the club".

As of 18 November 2009, German automobile manufacturer BMW was still the official owner of BMW Sauber Formula One team and continued to pay the salaries of their approximately 400 employees. On 27 November, BMW announced that it was to sell the team to Peter Sauber instead of Qadbak. A spokesman for BMW was reported in the Guardian newspaper as saying that the combination of no legally effective contract and no starting place on the grid caused the deal with Qadbak to be cancelled. If the Qadbak deal had been put in place, former Sauber drivers Giancarlo Fisichella and Nick Heidfeld would have been driving for them.

Sale of Notts County 

On 10 December 2009, BBC Nottingham reported that Munto Finance had put Notts County up for sale. On 12 December 2009, it was announced that Notts County chairman, Peter Trembling had purchased the club for a nominal fee from Munto Finance.

References

Investment companies of the British Virgin Islands